Laelapsella is a genus of mites in the family Laelapidae.

Species
 Laelapsella humi Womersley, 1955

References

Laelapidae